Washington Escarpment is the major west-facing escarpment of the Neptune Range, Pensacola Mountains in Antarctica, extending some 50 miles (80 km) and being the point of origin of a number of west-trending rock ridges. Mapped by United States Geological Survey (USGS) from surveys and U.S. Navy air photos, 1956–66. Named by Advisory Committee on Antarctic Names (US-ACAN) for the University of Washington at Seattle. Several members of the Neptune Range field party of 1963-64 attended this university.

References

Escarpments of Queen Elizabeth Land
University of Washington
Escarpments of Antarctica